Calcio may refer to:

Football in Italy
Calcio Fiorentino, an early form of football that originated in 16th-century Italy
Calcio 2000, Italian football magazine
Calcio, Lombardy, a town and commune in the province of Bergamo, Lombardy, Italy